Pioneer Day is an official holiday celebrated on July 24 in the American state of Utah, with some celebrations taking place in regions of surrounding states originally settled by Mormon pioneers. It commemorates the entry of Brigham Young and the first group of Mormon pioneers into the Salt Lake Valley on July 24, 1847, where the Latter-day Saints settled after being forced from Nauvoo, Illinois, and other locations in the eastern United States. Parades, fireworks, rodeos, and other festivities help commemorate the event. Similar to July 4, many local and all state-run government offices and many businesses are closed on Pioneer Day.

In addition to being an official holiday in Utah, Pioneer Day is considered a special occasion by many members of the Church of Jesus Christ of Latter-day Saints (LDS Church). On Pioneer Day, some Latter-day Saints walk portions of the Mormon Trail or reenact entering the Salt Lake Valley by handcart. Latter-day Saints throughout the United States and around the world may celebrate July 24 in remembrance of the LDS Church's pioneer era, with songs, dances, potlucks, and pioneer related activities.

While the holiday has strong links to the LDS Church, it is officially a celebration for everyone, regardless of faith and nationality, who immigrated to the Salt Lake Valley during the pioneer era, which is generally considered to have ended with the 1869 arrival of the transcontinental railroad. Notable non-LDS American pioneers from this period include Episcopal Bishop Daniel S. Tuttle, who was responsible for Utah's first non-Mormon schools (Rowland Hall-St. Mark's) and first public hospital (St. Mark's) in the late 19th century. The Intertribal Powwow at Liberty Park in Salt Lake City honors the cultural heritage and contributions of the area's Native Americans, helping Utahns to gain a deeper understanding of the region's history.

History

The earliest precursor to Pioneer Day celebrations in Utah occurred on July 24, 1849, when the Nauvoo Brass Band led a commemoration of the second anniversary of the Latter-day Saints entering the Salt Lake Valley.

The celebration of Pioneer Day in 1857 was interrupted with news of the approach of Johnston's Army, heralding the beginning of the Utah War. Immediately following the occupation of the Utah Territory by federal troops, Pioneer Day was sparsely celebrated. Pioneer Day continually expanded into the surrounding areas as the Mormon Corridor spread throughout the Intermountain West. In 1880, Latter-day Saints commemorated the Golden Jubilee of the church's formal organization in 1830; tens of thousands of people in hundreds of communities participated in enthusiastic celebrations.

In the years that followed, federal enforcement efforts of anti-polygamy laws (including the 1882 Edmunds Act) resulted in greatly subdued celebrations. The 1886 commemoration was particularly notable for its mourning theme, with the Salt Lake Tabernacle decorated in black instead of the usually colorful bunting, and the eulogizing of Latter-day Saints who were in hiding or imprisoned for polygamy offenses. By 1897, the celebration included not only the 50th anniversary of the initial arrival in the Salt Lake Valley, but also the end of the polygamy issue, the completion of the Salt Lake Temple, and statehood for Utah.

The centennial in 1947 and the sesquicentennial in 1997 were especially large celebrations in Utah. One writer indicated that the 1947 celebrations seemed to incorporate the entire year, with July 24 only being an apex to the events.

The holiday generates a great deal of road traffic; Utah Department of Public Safety statistics states Pioneer Day has the second highest holiday traffic fatality rate in Utah, with the earlier July 4 Independence Day having the highest rate.

The holiday has received criticism for its lack of inclusiveness for non-Mormons. As a result, a small, growing contingent has started celebrating Pie and Beer Day instead of the traditional Pioneer Day. Pie and Beer day is a play on words: "pie and beer" sounds like "pioneer." Pie and Beer Day was created as a counter culture alternative.

See also

 Days of '47 Parade, part of Salt Lake City's celebration of Pioneer Day
 This Is the Place Heritage Park
 This is the Place Monument
 Utah…This Is The Place
 Mormon folklore: Pioneer Day

Notes

External links

Festivals in Utah
July observances
Mormon migration to Utah
State holidays in the United States
1849 establishments in the State of Deseret
Mormonism and politics